The 1991 World Junior Curling Championships were held from March 9 to 17 in Glasgow, Scotland.

Men

Teams

Round Robin

Tiebreaker

Playoffs

Rankings

Women

Teams

Round Robin

Playoffs

Rankings

Awards
WJCC All-Star Team:

WJCC Sportsmanship Award:

Sources

J
1991 in Scottish sport
World Junior Curling Championships
International sports competitions in Glasgow
International curling competitions hosted by Scotland
March 1991 sports events in the United Kingdom
1991 in youth sport
1990s in Glasgow